Jacek Daniluk (1 September 1961 – 6 September 1986) was a Polish equestrian. He competed in two events at the 1980 Summer Olympics.

References

External links
 

1961 births
1986 deaths
Polish male equestrians
Olympic equestrians of Poland
Equestrians at the 1980 Summer Olympics
People from Kwidzyn